Megachile disputabilis is a species of bee in the family Megachilidae. It was described by Krombein in 1951.

References

Disputabilis
Insects described in 1951